Anaerolineaceae is a family of bacteria from the order of Anaerolineales.
Anaerolineaceae bacteria occur in marine sediments. There are a total of twelve genera in this family, most of which only encompass one species. All known members of the family are Gram-negative and non-motile. They also do not form bacterial spores and are either mesophilic or thermophilic obligate anaerobes. It is also known that all species in this family are chemoheterotrophs.

History 
The first species discovered in the family Anaerolineaceae was the species Anaerolinea thermophila, with a report on the matter written by Yuji Sekiguchi et. al. in 2003. It was isolated alongside the bacterial species Caldilinea aerophila, a facultative anaerobe. The discovery of these two specimens prompted the addition of a new subphylum in bacterial taxonomy.

Phylogeny
The currently accepted taxonomy is based on the List of Prokaryotic names with Standing in Nomenclature (LPSN) and National Center for Biotechnology Information (NCBI).

References

Further reading
 
 
 

Chloroflexota